Stephanie Pitcher is an American politician and attorney, and Senator in the Utah State Senate. She served two terms as a member of the Utah House of Representatives from the 40th district, from 2019 through 2022.

Early life and career
Pitcher earned a Bachelor of Arts degree in English creative writing from Utah State University and an MPA from the University of Utah in 2011. In 2015, she earned a Juris Doctor from the S.J. Quinney College of Law.

Career
In 2016, Pitcher helped create the Utah Women's Coalition, which promoted legislation on issues such as family leave, protection of breastfeeding in public, and child care. Pitcher is a prosecutor for Davis County, Utah.

Pitcher ran against Republican Peter L. Kraus in 2018 for a seat in the Utah House of Representatives, and won with 70% of the vote.

In 2020, Pitcher introduced cash bail reform legislation that was passed by the Utah legislature and signed by Governor Spencer Cox in 2021. The bill introduced requirements that bail decisions reflect risk factors. The intended goal was to prevent people who posed little threat to society spent unnecessary time being imprisoned because they were unable to pay bail.

Personal life 
An avid chess player, Pitcher is ranked WCM (Woman candidate master), and has won the Utah State Women's Chess Championship eight times.

References

Living people
Utah State University alumni
University of Utah alumni
S.J. Quinney College of Law alumni
21st-century American politicians
21st-century American women politicians
Women state legislators in Utah
Democratic Party members of the Utah House of Representatives
Year of birth missing (living people)